Northern Suburbs District Cricket Club is a cricket club playing in the XXXX Gold premiership, the leading club cricket competition in Queensland, Australia.  Northern Suburbs District Cricket Club has produced some of the finest players to represent Queensland and Australia in one day and test cricket competition.  Many fine players have represented the Northern Suburbs District Cricket Club at club and representative level, such as Ian Healy and Joe Burns.

Club history
In 1925-26 the Metropolitan Electorate Cricket Competition, played under the auspices of the Queensland Cricket Association, was contested in three grades by teams representing South Brisbane, Valleys, Western Suburbs, Eastern Suburbs and Toombul Electorate Clubs as well as the University of Queensland Cricket Club.

To provide additional opportunities for players to participate in the competition, the number of teams competing in the "A" grade competition for the following season was increased to eight by the inclusion of two colts sides. Further teams were also included in the lower grades. This move was not a success and in 1927 it was decided to create a new electorate club centred on the Kelvin Grove City District, with certain areas previously covered by the Toombul, Western Suburbs and Valley Clubs being allocated to it.

The inaugural meeting of this Club was held on 28 June 1927 and was presided over by Alderman E Lanham. It was granted affiliation with the Queensland Cricket Association for the 1927–28 season under the name of Kelvin Grove Electorate Cricket Association. In 1928 the fledgling Club changed its name to Northern Suburbs Electorate Cricket Club and subsequently became known as Northern Suburbs District Cricket Club in 1931.

Location
The club is based at Shaw Park in the Brisbane suburb of Wooloowin.

Executive committee
The Executive Committee for 2020/2021 was:
 Mr Paul Keller - President
 Mr Jon Hopes - Vice President & Chairman of Selectors
 Mr Tony Comerford - Treasurer
 Mr Mitchell Witt - Secretary
 Mr Michael Wright - Executive
 Mr Andrew Campbell - Executive 
 Mr Henry Coventry - Executive 
 Mr Adam Lavis - Executive

Competitions
Currently Norths has teams entered in the following competitions:

Grade - Xxxx Gold Grade Competition (2-day competition)
 1st Grade - The First Grade Competition
 2nd Grade - The Alan Pettigrew Shield
 3rd Grade - The Norm McMahon Shield
 4th Grade - The Bob Spence Shield
 5th Grade - The Roy Tanner Shield
 6th Grade - The WEP Harris Shield

One-day competitions
 1st Grade - One Day Competition
 1st Grade Twenty/20
 Over 40s One Day Competition

Under age competitions
 Under 19 - One Day Competition
 Under 17 - Two day Competition (Lord's Taverners)

Women's Competitions
 2nd Grade - The Second Grade Shield

Awards
Awards for the 2009/2010 season included:
 Q F Rice Memorial Trophy.  Awarded for the most outstanding cricketer in the Club:  Joe Burns
 W T Rhoades Memorial Trophy.  Awarded for the most outstanding performer from the senior grade fixtures outside of first grade, the player being recognised as our champion of the lower grades:  Jordan Buckley
 Alan Pettigrew Memorial Trophy.  Awarded for an outstanding performance from players in the senior grades:  Andrew Michael
 E.A. Toovey MBE, OAM Trophy.  Awarded to the most outstanding under 17 cricketer:  Nicholas Sale
 Bob McColm Trophy. Awarded to the batsman with the highest aggregate of runs in the senior grades from the fixture rounds: Joe Burns
 Charles Family Perpetual Trophy. Awarded for an outstanding performance in the senior grades:  Dane Hutchinson
 Roger Harris Perpetual Trophy. Awarded to our most outstanding Under 19 player:  Tim Gregory
 Robin Pascoe Perpetual Trophy. Awarded for an outstanding bowling performance:  Dane Hutchinson
 Bryan Phelan Perpetual Trophy. Awarded to the most outstanding player in the over 40s competition:  Dom Ovenden
 Ian Kerr Memorial Trophy. Awarded for outstanding dedication to the club off the field: Tony Commerford
 Stan Boucaut Memorial Trophy.  Awarded for an outstanding contribution to the Club by a player:  Greg Pyne
 Ovenden Trophy. Awarded for an outstanding fielding performance - either fielding or Wicket-keeping:  Ben Dunk
 Betty Kerr Perpetual Trophy. Awarded to the most outstanding women cricketer in the Club:  Courtney Jones
 Women's Coaches Award. Awarded by the coach to the most improved player:  Angela Earle

Merit Medallions
Each season Norths recognises the most outstanding cricketers from the grade competition.  In the 2009/2010 season these were:
 Wally Wright
 Andrew Michael
 Jacob Harris
 Jordan Buckley
 Joe Burns

Special Awards and Mentions:  Jordan Buckley - Award 2nd Grade for 1000 runs and 100 wickets

Player of the Week
The Players of the Week during the 2009/2010 season were:
 Week 2 - Andrew Michael (1st Grade) 95 no v Redlands
 Week 7 - Tim Gregory 123 v Valley (Maiden century on debut in 1st Grade)
 Week 13 - Brenton Goves (6th Grade) 179 no v Redlands
 Week 16 - Dom Michael (1st Grade ODC) 96 v Toombul
 Week 17 - Joe Burns (1st Grade) 148 v Gold Coast District Cricket Club

Junior Club
Wilston Norths Junior Cricket Club is a junior club associated with the Northern Suburbs District Cricket Club. WNJCC was awarded the title of "Champion Club" in the Brisbane North Junior Cricket Association in 2009–2010.

See also

References

External links
official club website
junior club website
Queensland Cricket

Queensland District Cricket clubs
Sporting clubs in Brisbane
1927 establishments in Australia
Cricket clubs established in 1927
Wooloowin, Queensland